Nazwā is a village in the Emirate of Sharjah, United Arab Emirates (UAE), located just off the Dubai-Hatta highway between Lahbab and Madam, and near the Emirate of Dubai.

Info 
A small village, Nazwa is known for Qarn Nazwā, a limestone outcrop and surrounding desert area known for bird watching.

Al Ghaf Conservation Reserve, located on the Dubai side of Nazwa, was one of six such reserves announced by the government of Dubai in May 2014. The Ghaf (Prosopis cineraria) is the national tree of the UAE.

References 

Populated places in the Emirate of Sharjah